Shea Spitzbarth (born October 4, 1994) is an American professional baseball pitcher who is a free agent. He has played in Major League Baseball (MLB) for the Pittsburgh Pirates. He made his MLB debut in 2021.

Amateur career
Spitzbarth was born and raised in Staten Island, New York. He played baseball at Moore Catholic High School, where he received All-City, All-Staten Island, and Advance All-Star honors. He would go on to pitch at Molloy College. After the completion of his junior season in 2015, he played collegiate summer baseball with the Wareham Gatemen of the Cape Cod Baseball League. He caught the eye of a Los Angeles Dodgers scout, was offered a contract, and signed.

Professional career

Los Angeles Dodgers
Spitzbarth officially signed with the Los Angeles Dodgers on July 10, 2015, and began his professional career with the rookie-level AZL Dodgers and Ogden Raptors, posting a 2.75 ERA in 15 appearances. He split the 2016 season between Ogden and the Single-A Great Lakes Loons and Triple-A Oklahoma City Dodgers, accumulating a 2.72 ERA with 60 strikeouts in 24 games. In 2017, Spitzbarth played for the High-A Rancho Cucamonga Quakes and Double-A Tulsa Drillers, pitching to a 2.45 ERA with 77 strikeouts in 69.2 innings of work. The following season, Spitzbarth split time between Tulsa and Oklahoma City, registering a 4.32 ERA with 86 strikeouts in 66.2 innings pitched across 40 appearances. He returned to the two teams for the 2019 season, working to a 4.09 ERA with 89 strikeouts across 52 contests. Spitzbarth did not play in a game in 2020 due to the cancellation of the minor league season because of the COVID-19 pandemic.

Pittsburgh Pirates
On December 10, 2020, the Pittsburgh Pirates selected Spitzbarth in the minor league phase of the Rule 5 Draft. He was assigned to the Triple-A Indianapolis Indians to begin the season, where he pitched to a 2.12 ERA in 42 games. Spitzbarth was promoted to the major leagues for the first time on August 2, 2021. He made his Major League Baseball debut that day, pitching against the Milwaukee Brewers. Spitzbarth posted a 3.60 ERA with 1 strikeout in 5.0 innings of work across 5 appearances for Pittsburgh. On November 6, 2021, Spitzbarth was outrighted off of the 40-man roster and elected free agency the next day.

Detroit Tigers
On April 3, 2022, Spitzbarth signed a minor league contract with the Detroit Tigers organization. He elected free agency on November 10, 2022.

See also
Rule 5 draft results

References

External links

Living people
1994 births
Sportspeople from Staten Island
Baseball players from New York City
Major League Baseball pitchers
Pittsburgh Pirates players
Wareham Gatemen players
Arizona League Dodgers players
Ogden Raptors players
Great Lakes Loons players
Oklahoma City Dodgers players
Rancho Cucamonga Quakes players
Tulsa Drillers players
Glendale Desert Dogs players
Tigres del Licey players
American expatriate baseball players in the Dominican Republic
Indianapolis Indians players